Viva Records was a record label started in 1966 as a subsidiary of Snuff Garrett Records. The records were distributed by Dot Records until 1971. From 1971 until 1983 they were distributed by Warner Bros. Records.

See also
 List of record labels

American record labels
Record labels established in 1966
Record labels disestablished in 1983